Central is a census-designated place (CDP) in Yukon-Koyukuk Census Area, Alaska, United States. At the 2010 census the population was 96, down from 134 in 2000. Every February, Central hosts a checkpoint for the long-distance Yukon Quest sled dog race.

Geography
Central is located at  (65.533461, -144.695650). The elevation is 942 feet. The Steese Highway (Alaska Route 6) does pass through Central.

Climate
Central has a continental subarctic climate (Köppen Dfc).

Demographics

Central first appeared on the 1950 U.S. Census as an unincorporated village. It was made a census-designated place (CDP) in 1980.

As of the census of 2000, there were 134 people, 67 households, and 33 families residing in the CDP. The population density was 0.5 people per square mile (0.2/km2). There were 169 housing units at an average density of 0.7 per square mile (0.3/km2). The racial makeup of the CDP was 84.33% White, 7.46% Native American, 0.75% Asian, 2.99% from other races, and 4.48% from two or more races. 0.75% of the population were Hispanic or Latino of any race.

There were 67 households, out of which 14.9% had children under the age of 18 living with them, 46.3% were married couples living together, 1.5% had a female householder with no husband present, and 50.7% were non-families. 43.3% of all households were made up of individuals, and 4.5% had someone living alone who was 65 years of age or older. The average household size was 2.00 and the average family size was 2.82.

In the CDP, the population was spread out, with 20.1% under the age of 18, 3.7% from 18 to 24, 27.6% from 25 to 44, 41.8% from 45 to 64, and 6.7% who were 65 years of age or older. The median age was 44 years. For every 100 females, there were 135.1 males. For every 100 females age 18 and over, there were 143.2 males.

The median income for a household in the CDP was $36,875, and the median income for a family was $41,250. Males had a median income of $60,750 versus $24,375 for females. The per capita income for the CDP was $22,593. There were 15.8% of families and 22.5% of the population living below the poverty line, including 34.6% of under eighteens and none of those over 64.

Education
It was previously served by a school of the Yukon Flats School District.

References

Census-designated places in Alaska
Census-designated places in Unorganized Borough, Alaska
Census-designated places in Yukon–Koyukuk Census Area, Alaska
Yukon Quest